USS Newport News may refer to the following ships operated by the United States Navy:

, was a German cargo ship named Odenwald, taken over by the US Navy during World War I
, was a  heavy cruiser in service from 1948 to 1978
, is a  commissioned in 1989 and currently in active service

United States Navy ship names
Newport News, Virginia